Oscorp (sometimes stylized as OsCorp), also known as Oscorp Industries, is a fictional multibillion-dollar multinational corporation appearing in American comic books published by Marvel Comics, predominantly in stories about Spider-Man. The company was founded by Norman Osborn and has appeared in numerous media adaptations. According to Forbes, highlighting the 25 largest fictional companies, it had an estimated sales of $3.1 billion, ranking it at number 23.

History
The corporation is based out of the Oscorp Tower in New York. It was created and run by its CEO Norman Osborn. Norman studied chemistry and electrical engineering in college. He also took a number of courses in business administration. Norman's teacher, Professor Mendel Stromm, formed the business partnership. Since Norman put up the bulk of the financing, they called their company the Osborn Corporation, or Oscorp.

Stromm's early research was on a chemical that would provide enhanced strength in its test subjects and would eventually turn Osborn into the Green Goblin. Osborn, wanting the formula for himself, discovered that Stromm had been embezzling funds from Oscorp. Stromm explained that he was merely borrowing but Osborn turned him over to the police. After several years in prison, Stromm was released and tried to kill Osborn for revenge using evil robots. He was stopped by the superhero Spider-Man and seemingly died of a heart attack when he was nearly shot.

Jay Allan's company "Allan Chemical" was merged with Normie Osborn's stocks from Oscorp and the last remaining properties of Horizon Labs after its destruction, establishing it under the new name of "Alchemax".

It was later revealed that Norman Osborn under the guise of "Mason Banks" created the corporation in order to leave a strong empire for his grandson and establish an empire for the Osborn legacy. Their headquarters Oscorp Tower was the former headquarters of Oscorp.

By 2099, Alchemax would eventually control most aspects of daily life in a possible future.

Fictional staff members

Current
 Norman Osborn - The Founder and CEO of Oscorp.

Former
 Arthur Stacy - The Chief of Security at Oscorp who is the brother of George Stacy and the uncle of Gwen Stacy.
 Charles Standish - The Senior Vice-President of Oscorp. Charles Standish was kidnapped by the Flaming Sword, but he was eventually rescued by the Avengers.
 Donald Menken - The personal assistant of Norman Osborn.
 Dr. David Patrick Lowell - A scientist who became Sundown upon being drenched in his chemicals that was similar to the Goblin Formula.
 Dr. Malek - A scientist who was part of the research team that was experimenting on Freak.
 Dr. Nels van Adder - A research scientist whose formula turned him into the Proto-Goblin.
 Dr. David Lowell - He developed the Photogenesis Project for Oscorp, and discovered a way to give a human superpowers through photosynthesis.
 Harry Osborn - Norman's son who for a time served as CEO.
 Mendel Stromm - Former partner of Norman Osborn.
 Mark Raxton - Former Head of Security.

Other versions

Ultimate Marvel
In the Ultimate Marvel universe, Oscorp is much the same as in the Earth-616 version. The company is owned and operated by Norman Osborn who developed the Oz super soldier serum and the spiders who were behind the abilities of Peter Parker, and later Miles Morales. After an incident in which Osborn injected himself with Oz serum and became the Green Goblin, a big portion of the main building was left in ruins, and numerous scientists died or transitioned to other companies like Roxxon in the case of Conrad Marcus. Osborn Industries had been mentioned to still produce technologies.

In other media

Television
 Oscorp was featured in Spider-Man: The Animated Series. Norman Osborn hires Spencer Smythe to create a weapon to destroy Spider-Man by creating the Spider-Slayer. The deal made with Osborn meant that Norman would build a hoverchair for Spencer's paralyzed son, Alistair. The Slayer unintentionally captured Flash Thompson dressed as Spider-Man, and the real Spider-Man came to his rescue. This led to a large scale fire in the Oscorp plant. Norman Osborn quoted to Spencer "Remember our deal. No Spider-Splat, No Hoverchair." Spencer chose to stay behind and finish Spider-Man off while Norman got Alistair to safety. After the Spider-Slayer was destroyed by Spider-Man, Oscorp exploded and Spencer supposedly perished. However, Spencer had survived, having been found by the Kingpin. Norman invented the technology which would create the Hobgoblin and hired him to assassinate Kingpin. The assassination was foiled by Peter Parker and the Kingpin suspected a conspiracy against him. Norman subsequently fired the Hobgoblin, who allied with Kingpin and kidnapped Norman's son Harry. When the Kingpin refused to pay Hobgoblin immediately, they ceased their partnership. Following this, Osborn sold 50% of his company to the Kingpin in order to repay his debt. Norman and his partner Wardell Stromm were forced into creating chemical weapons for the Kingpin. An unstable reaction resulted during one experiment and Norman seemed to have perished in the explosion. However, Norman had survived the explosion, his strength enhanced by the gas from the explosion, and this combined with the Hobgoblin weapons created the Green Goblin. He then began kidnapping the Oscorp stockholders including Board members J. Jonah Jamison, Kingpin and Anastasia Hardy (mother of Felicia Hardy), although Spider-Man uncovered an underwater base where the Goblin intended to kill them. Fighting the Goblin, Spider-Man unmasked him. Amnesia ensued and Norman was unable to remember his dual identity. The following morning, Norman publicly announced that Oscorp would no longer be involved in the creation of chemical weapons, and allowing Harry to be brought on board.

 Oscorp is briefly featured in Spider-Man: The New Animated Series. In the episode "Heroes and Villains", Oscorp board of directors are convincing Empire State University to destroy one of its housing developments, Villaroy Towers, which prompts the arrival of a new vigilante Turbo Jet (secretly former NASA engineer Louis Wyler). In "Law of the Jungle", the vengeful Curt Connors in his Lizard state attacks Oscorp Tower and almost killed Harry if not for Spider-Man. It's revealed Curt lost his right arm due to testing a weapon: Wide Area Explosive Fragmentation Round (WAFER) and tried to sue the company but the case was thrown out. In "When Sparks Fly", a returning Electro is stopped by Spider-Man using an Oscorp High Voltage Storage container.

 Oscorp is featured in The Spectacular Spider-Man. Oscorp is the leading chemical manufacturing firm (which also had research divisions that dealt in other areas) that is based in New York City and was founded and owned by the ruthless businessman, inventor, and gifted chemist named Norman Osborn. At some point, Norman came across a chemical formula with the intention of using it to increase a person's intelligence and physical strength. Osborn tried to recreate the chemical (secretly) and used small doses of it. The formula indeed increased his intelligence and strength, but it also drove him insane. He created a Halloween-like costume for himself which he colored green after the solution and named himself the "Green Goblin" for which his major objective was to become the reigning crime boss in New York and to kill Spider-Man.

 Oscorp is featured in the Ultimate Spider-Man animated series. Similar to the Ultimate Marvel reality, Norman contacted Dr. Otto Octavius to capture Spider-Man and told his plan to create super soldiers from his DNA. Octavius hired the Frightful Four to do the job. Later that day Octavius got a message from Wizard that they found the vigilante. The next day when the Frightful Four were defeated, Norman chided Octavius, which the latter promised not to fail him again. Doctor Octopus later sends out an Octobot to acquire a sample of Spider-Man, the tiny Octobot came back with it and he created the Venom symbiote out of the sample. Norman ordered him to make of it in one day. Later, when Norman came back from his home, the vicinity was destroyed by Venom who escaped and searched for Spider-Man. After Venom was supposedly destroyed, Norman congratulated Octavius for the success and ordered him to make an advanced prototype of it. Doctor Octopus hired Taskmaster to capture Spider-Man. After Taskmaster returned from a failed mission, Octavius went into a rage and destroyed his facility, while Taskmaster decided to take revenge on Spider-Man.

 In the Avengers Assemble animated series, an Oscorp building is seen in the episode "Dark Avengers".

 Oscorp appears in Marvel's Spider-Man. It had a containment breach where some experimental spiders the company was working were on let loose in the facility; one spider went on to bite Midtown High student Peter Parker. Additionally, there's Osborn Academy as a technological rival to Horizon High, and a hi-tech security force called the Osborn Commandos made up of Osborn Academy's staff and students.

Film

Sam Raimi's Spider-Man trilogy 
Oscorp is featured in the first two films of Sam Raimi's Spider-Man trilogy.
 Oscorp Labs appears throughout Spider-Man (2002). Depicted as a chemical corporation based in New York headed by Norman Osborn (Willem Dafoe) and Mendell Stromm, it had a hand in military technology that produced a green metal flight-suit and purple flying glider, which after Norman undergoes the experiment with his own serum, he becomes superhuman yet is driven insane, and steals the armor and glider, becoming the Green Goblin. He then bombs rival Quest Aerospace during a test of their own exosuit, but this only propels the board to oust Norman by selling Oscorp to Quest via buyout. During the unity day festival, the Green Goblin murders the board via pumpkin bomb in retribution, eliminating the last threat towards his control over the company.
 In Spider-Man 2 (2004), Harry assumes control of Oscorp after Norman's death and funds Otto Octavius' ambition for fusion power. After a demonstration goes awry, which results in the death of Otto's wife Rosie, the destruction of the fusion reactor, and the electrocution of Otto that transforms him into Doctor Octopus, Harry claims "he's ruined" from his losses in the accident.

The Amazing Spider-Man duology 
Oscorp is featured in The Amazing Spider-Man (2012) and The Amazing Spider-Man 2 (2014), both directed by Marc Webb.
In the films, Oscorp is portrayed as a powerful and corrupt scientific corporation headed by Norman Osborn, who uses the company's vast resources in various attempts to find a cure for his terminal disease. The corporation is involved in a variety of illegal conspiracies, such as the framing and murder of Richard and Mary Parker, and the development of the spider-venom that gave Spider-Man his powers. Oscorp's scientific experiments and illegal activities play a role in the development of several supervillains, including the Lizard, Electro, Green Goblin, and Rhino. Additionally, Oscorp has control over the Ravencroft Institute for the Criminally Insane, in which they perform illegal and inhumane scientific experiments on the institute's mental patients. These experiments are over-seen by a mad scientist named Dr. Ashley Kafka.

Marvel Cinematic Universe 
 The Oscorp building from The Amazing Spider-Man was intended to appear in the Marvel Cinematic Universe (MCU) film The Avengers (2012). However, by the time the Oscorp building was fully designed for The Amazing Spider-Man, the skyline for The Avengers was rendered, so the idea was abandoned due to timing constraints.
 In Spider-Man: No Way Home (2021), Norman Osborn, who is transported from the Sam Raimi films' universe, is unable to find his company in the MCU’s New York City, and assumes it does not exist.

Sony's Spider-Man Universe 
An Oscorp building appeared in the trailer for the Sony's Spider-Man Universe film Morbius (2022); however, it was cut from the final version of the film.

Video games
 Oscorp appears in the 2002 Spider-Man video game. The company in the game parallels that of the film, with Norman Osborn and his scientists attempting to capture Spider-Man in order to study his genetics to perfect a super-soldier serum that the company needs to develop for a military contract. After a number of failed attempts to capture Spider-Man using Oscorp robots, Norman subjects himself to the unfinished serum and becomes the Green Goblin.

 Oscorp appears in Spider-Man: Friend or Foe. Spider-Man fights Green Goblin on the helipad at Oscorp's Japanese branch.

 Oscorp appears in Lego Marvel Super Heroes. The Avengers seem to be unaware that Green Goblin is Norman Osborn since they did not know why he went to Oscorp. Later on, Spider-Man, allied with Black Widow and Hawkeye, ventures through Oscorp while pursuing the Goblin, leading them to a fight with Venom.

 The Oscorp logo from The Amazing Spider-Man as well as The Amazing Spider-Man video game has been used in Iron Man 3: The Official Game, which is based on the film of the same name.

 Oscorp appears in The Amazing Spider-Man video game. In the game, the company has largely shifted its focus towards Alistair Smythe's Spider-Slayers and other advanced robotics in response to the proliferation of "Cross-Species" experiments based on disgraced Oscorp scientist Curt Connors's research, such as Scorpion/MAC, Rhino, Iguana and Nattie. Other staff members mentioned or featured in the game include Otto Octavius, Mendell Stromm, and Michael Morbius.

 Oscorp appears in The Amazing Spider-Man 2 video game. Gang leader Herman Schultz and members of the Russian mob steal Oscorp technology to fight each other for dominance; Schultz in particular uses one of the stolen devices to become the Shocker later on. The tech stolen by the Russians features in the game's challenges. 

 Oscorp appears in Marvel Contest of Champions video game.

Marvel's Spider-Man game series 
Oscorp Industries appears in the Marvel's Spider-Man series developed by Insomniac Games. This version of the company was co-founded by Norman Osborn and Otto Octavius, and its name derives from "the Os", Norman and Otto's college nickname. However, Otto eventually left the company due to Norman's corruption and the dangerous and unethical experiments Oscorp conducted. Thanks to Norman's position as mayor of New York, Oscorp technology has been implemented into many of the city's public services, Research stations were also set up throughout the city by Norman's son Harry Osborn to carry out his late mother and Norman's deceased wife Emily's wishes of eradicating pollution and cleaning the environment and are part of a side-quest in the game.

 In Marvel's Spider-Man, the company plays a central role, as it created the "Devil's Breath", a bio-weapon originally intended to be a treatment for genetic disorders. Early on in the game Norman tries a thinly veiled attempt to get Otto to come back to work for Oscorp and continue his research into his experiment involving his tentacled arms, only for a bitter Octavius to reject it. Oscorp is also responsible for the creation of Mister Negative, who was a test subject for Devil's Breath as a child. When New York is besieged by Mister Negative's Inner Demons and the Sinister Six, a supervillain group created by Otto, who fell victim to the corrosive AI in his tentacles and became Doctor Octopus to exact revenge on Norman, Oscorp's response is to hire Sable International and allow them to put the city under martial law, resulting in further abuses and corruption. The former chief scientist of the Devil’s Breath project, Morgan Michaels, betrays his employer by helping Spider-Man devise a cure for Devil's Breath. It is revealed by the end of the game that the reason Norman created the Devil’s Breath in the first place was to cure the terminal illness of his son Harry, whom he is desperate to save after losing his wife Emily to the same illness.

 In Marvel's Spider-Man: Miles Morales, the Underground use Oscorp's abandoned science center as a hideout. The science center prior to being abandoned appears in a flashback in which Miles Morales and Phin Mason win a contest held there by presenting the energy converter they created before entering their respective high schools. The science center is actually the first time both Miles and Phin indirectly met Peter and Otto, when the two latter visited the center for an idea of their prosthetic project, despite Otto already quit Oscorp during that time, yet still permitted to visit its center.

See also
 Alchemax
 Cross Technological Enterprises
 Roxxon Energy Corporation
 Parker Industries
 Stark Industries

References

External links
 Oscorp at Marvel Wiki
 Oscorp at Comic Vine

1966 in comics
Spider-Man